Armando Ramos (November 15, 1948 – July 6, 2008) was an American professional boxer and the former two-time WBC and WBA Lightweight Champion. He was born in Long Beach, California. Armando "Mando" Ramos was one of the most popular fighters in Southern California during the 1960s. Ramos was an outstanding amateur.

Professional career
Mando Ramos turned pro at age 17 using a forged birth certificate. Mando went on to fight the main event at the Olympic Auditorium by his 8th pro fight. At the age of 18 Mando defeated the reigning Jr. Lightweight Champ, Japan's Hiroshi Kobayashi, in a non-title bout. When offered a re-match for the title, Ramos refused to fight for a 'Junior' title.

World Lightweight Champion
He demanded to fight dangerous Lightweight Champ Carlos Ortiz—Ortiz, who had dominated the division for over a decade. Negotiations were in place, but Ortiz was upset by 'Teo' Cruz and so Ramos took the fight to the new champ, narrowly losing in a decision. Ramos won the re-match via KO to become the youngest Lightweight Champion in history. Cruz would only live 11 more months. He died in a plane crash on January 1970 alongside the Puerto Rican national women's volleyball team at the Dominicana DC-9 air disaster.

When a Mando Ramos fight was held in Los Angeles, movie stars such as John Wayne, Bill Cosby, Kirk Douglas, Liz Taylor and Connie Stevens attended . Women caught Mandomania, and Hollywood loved 'The Wonder Boy'.

Trained by Hall of Fame trainer Jackie McCoy, Ramos fought ten World title fights, was a two-time champion and earned millions of dollars. Whilst Mickey Mantle and Joe Namath earned 100k per season, Ramos was earning 100k per night. He was the world's highest paid teenager and his purses were larger than anyone but Muhammad Ali's. McCoy stated Mando was the most naturally talented fighter he had ever seen in his life.

Retirement
Tough fights, drugs, and alcohol put the brakes on his career. By age 24 Ramos was out of boxing. With the aid of his wife, Sylvia Van Hecke, Ramos became clean and sober over his last three decades. He founded a non-profit youth organization---B.A.A.D.--boxing against alcohol and drugs— and coached, mentored, and trained inner-city at-risk youths.

Mando Ramos died suddenly at his home in San Pedro, California on July 6, 2008.

Professional boxing record

See also
List of world lightweight boxing champions

References

External links

|-

|-

|-

1948 births
2008 deaths
American male boxers
American boxers of Mexican descent
Boxers from California
Sportspeople from Long Beach, California
Lightweight boxers
World lightweight boxing champions
World Boxing Association champions
World Boxing Council champions
The Ring (magazine) champions